Events during the year 2017 in Ireland.

Incumbents

 President: Michael D. Higgins
 Taoiseach:
Enda Kenny (FG) (until 14 June 2017)
 Leo Varadkar (FG) (from 14 June 2017)
 Tánaiste:
 Frances Fitzgerald (FG) (until 28 November 2017)
 Simon Coveney (FG) (from 30 November 2017)
 Minister for Finance:
 Michael Noonan (FG) (until 14 June 2017)
 Paschal Donohoe (FG) (from 14 June 2017)
 Chief Justice:
 Susan Denham (until 26 July 2017)
 Frank Clarke (from 26 July 2017)
 Dáil: 32nd
 Seanad: 25th

Events

January
 2 January – The Minister for Communications, Climate Action and Environment, Denis Naughten, suffers minor injuries and is hospitalised after being struck by a car while cycling with his wife.
 3 January – The Irish Nurses and Midwives Organisation notes that there had been a record 612 patients admitted for care on trolleys in hospitals around the country on this morning.
 7 January – The second meeting of the Citizens' assembly takes place. The assembly is told how new neo-natal screenings which can detect chromosomal disorders such as Down Syndrome pose ethical issues for society.
 11 January – Members of a cross-party delegation group of TDs describe as "useful and productive" a meeting with the Egyptian president about the ongoing imprisonment without trial of Irish citizen Ibrahim Halawa.
 19 January – Sinn Féin's Martin McGuinness announces his retirement from politics, citing health reasons.
 20 January – A Women's March takes place in Dublin. The march was organised by the Abortion Rights Campaign, Amnesty International Ireland, European Network Against Racism, ROSA, and The Coalition to Repeal the 8th. Events also took place in County Galway and Castlebar, County Mayo.
 23 January – Three men are arrested as part of an investigation into an international illegal immigrant smuggling network through Dublin Airport. Two of those arrested are Aer Lingus employees at the airport.
 30 January – Taoiseach Enda Kenny and British Prime Minister Theresa May hold talks at Government Buildings on the United Kingdom's exit from the European Union and the impact on Anglo-Irish relations.
 31 January – Around 100 farmers participate in an IFA organised protest outside the Department of Agriculture in Dublin to highlight their anger over delays in payments to farmers for their participation in the GLAS agri-environment scheme.

February
 2 February – British Brexit Secretary David Davis tells the House of Commons that the UK's relationship with Ireland is one of the most important aspects of Brexit preparations.
 6 February – Dublin City Council passes a motion to grant the Freedom of the City to former US President Barack Obama and his wife, Michelle.
 15 February
 Taoiseach Enda Kenny rejects the suggestion that Ireland should leave European Union in major Brexit speech.
The Dáil passes a Fine Gael motion of confidence in the Government, tabled in response to Sinn Féin's motion of no confidence announced over the handling of the response to the Sgt Maurice McCabe affair.
 22 February – Following a week of speculation surrounding his future as leader of Fine Gael, Enda Kenny tells a meeting of his parliamentary party that he will deal with his future effectively and conclusively after the annual St Patrick's Day visit to the White House.
 23 February – Speaking in Brussels the Taoiseach has said he wants the final Brexit agreement between the European Union and Britain to allow for Irish reunification in line with the terms of the Good Friday Agreement.

March
 1 March – Taoiseach Enda Kenny announces in the Dáil that the State will formally recognise Irish Travellers as an indigenous ethnic minority.
 3 March – "Significant quantities" of human remains are discovered at the site of the former Bon Secours Mother and Baby Home in Tuam, County Galway. It comes after the Mother and Baby Homes Commission of Investigation began test excavations at the site of the children's burial ground following allegations about the deaths of 800 babies in Tuam over a number of decades and the manner in which they were buried.
 14 March – two crew members of the Coast Guard are killed and two more are missing after a search and rescue helicopter crashes off the coast of County Mayo.
 15 March
The British government rules out introducing Irish border posts after leaving the European Union.
Irish woman Danielle McLaughlin is found dead in a Goa tourist resort. Her body was found in Canacona, a district in the south of the state.
 16 March – Taoiseach Enda Kenny meets US President Donald Trump at the White House. The two leaders discuss the election in Northern Ireland and the potential issues around the border due to Brexit. Trump also confirms that he will visit Ireland during his term of office.
 21 March – Former deputy first minister of Northern Ireland Martin McGuinness dies in Derry aged 66.
 22 March – An Irish person is among the 40 injured during a terrorist attack in Westminster.
 24 March – Bus Éireann staff begin a nationwide strike.
 31 March – Iarnród Éireann and Dublin Bus services are stopped by Bus Éireann during morning rush hour. The wildcat strikes end at 10am.

April
2 April – Authorities at Rosslare Europort discover 14 people hidden in the back of a refrigerated truck that arrived from France.
9 April – The government announces that it will not oppose a bill put forward by a group of Independent Senators that proposes an end to the 90-year-old restriction on the sale of alcohol on Good Friday.
13 April – Dublin Bus workers vote to go on strike in solidarity with picketing Bus Éireann staff, a move which comes as the Bus Éireann strike is called off temporarily as the Labour Court issued its recommendations.
20 April – Taoiseach Enda Kenny becomes Fine Gael's longest serving Taoiseach, having surpassed the record of John A. Costello by completing his 2,234th day in office.
23 April – The Citizens' Assembly votes to recommend an extensive liberalisation of the grounds on which abortion is available in Ireland. The Assembly votes to recommend that terminations of pregnancy should be available in Ireland with "no restriction as to reasons" by a margin of 64% to 36%.
27 April
 Taoiseach Enda Kenny tells Fine Gael and the media he will deal with his future as Taoiseach before the end of May.
Dr. Peter Boylan resigns from the board of the National Maternity Hospital over a row that nuns will be running the new hospital.
28 April – Professor Chris Fitzpatrick resigns from the board of the National Maternity Hospital in support of Dr Peter Boylan who also resigned from the board over a row that nuns will the running the new maternity hospital.
29 April – At a special EU Brexit conference, there is a formal acknowledgement by EU leaders of the possibility for Northern Ireland rejoining the EU as part of united Ireland post-Brexit.

May
10 May – Prince Charles and the Duchess of Cornwall began a three-day trip to Ireland. They visit Antrim, Down, Kilkenny, Wicklow, Kildare and Glasnevin Cemetery.
11 May – The EU's chief Brexit negotiator Michel Barnier addressed a joint sitting of the Dáil and the Seanad.
17 May – Taoiseach Enda Kenny announced that he would retire as Fine Gael party leader at midnight. He would remain Taoiseach until a new party leader is elected on 2 June.
23 May – The former chairman and chief executive of Anglo Irish Bank, Seán FitzPatrick, was acquitted of 27 charges against him for misleading the bank's auditors and furnishing false information about multi-million euro loans to him and to people connected to him between 2002 and 2007.

June

 2 June – Leo Varadkar is elected Leader of Fine Gael, becoming the youngest leader of the party ever. He is the first openly gay leader of Fine Gael and the first leader of Fine Gael educated at Trinity College Dublin.
 13 June – Enda Kenny officially steps down as Taoiseach after tendering his resignation to President Higgins at Áras an Uachtaráin.
 14 June – Leo Varadkar is elected Taoiseach by Dáil Éireann and is later appointed by President Higgins.
 29 June – Six men, including Socialist Party TD Paul Murphy, who were on trial for the false imprisonment of former Tánaiste Joan Burton and her adviser are found not guilty by a jury at the Circuit Criminal Court.

July
 9 July – Two men drown off the coast of Donegal while on a fishing trip.
 26 July – Frank Clarke is named as the new Chief Justice by the government.

August
 4 August – Taoiseach Leo Varadkar makes his 'bridges not borders' speech in Belfast.
 16 August – The UK publishes its Brexit plan regarding Northern Ireland and the plan states they wish not to go back to border posts.
 17 August – Two Irish people are injured in a terrorist attack in Barcelona.
 22–23 August – Massive storm hits Donegal causing major damage.

September
 5 September – Sinn Féin leader Gerry Adams announces he will outline his plan from stepping down as leader in November.
 7 September – The government announces it will repay early, and in full, the outstanding €5.5 billion owed to the International Monetary Fund, Sweden and Denmark.
 10 September – Garda Commissioner Noirin O'Sullivan announces that she is standing down as Commissioner after 3 years of service.
 22 September – Taoiseach Leo Varadkar gives a "cautious welcome" to the British Prime Minister's keynote Brexit speech in Florence.
 25 September – Taoiseach Leo Varadkar meets British Prime Minister Theresa May in London as they discuss Brexit and Trade deals.
 26 September – Taoiseach Leo Varadkar confirms Ireland will hold 6 or 7 referendums between 2018 and 2019.

October
 4 October – Former Taoiseach Liam Cosgrave dies aged 97 at Tallaght Hospital.
 16 October – As the remnants of Hurricane Ophelia sweep across the island of Ireland, Four people are killed, one injured, the Department of Education and Skills closes all schools, all bus and train services are cancelled, most supermarkets close early, flights are cancelled and colleges close nationwide.
 18 October – The Oireachtas Committee on the Eighth Amendment voted not to retain Article 40.3.3 of the Constitution in full.
 24 October – Ibrahima Halawa arrives back in Ireland after four years of prison in Egypt.
 27 October – University College Dublin student union president, Katie Ascough, is impeached by 69 percent of students in a vote following the prevention by Ascough of publication in the annual student guide of information about abortion.

November
 1 November – Iarnród Éireann begins a nationwide strike, the first of five planned strike days on the railway.
 3 November – The citizens assembly meets to discuss climate change.
 17 November – Irish minister of Foreign affairs Simon Coveney and UK Secretary of State for Foreign affairs Boris Johnson meet in Dublin to discuss Northern Ireland, Brexit and Europe.
18 November – Sinn Féin leader Gerry Adams announces that he will stand down as leader in 2018.
 28 November – Frances Fitzgerald resigns as Taniste over her handling of emails regarding the Garda whistleblower scandal.
 30 November – Simon Coveney is named as the new Tánaiste.

December
8 December – The UK government and the Irish government agree on a Brexit deal which rules out a hard Border.
9 December – Luas Cross City tram service starts operating for the public in Dublin.

Arts and literature
 May – Dublin post-punk rock band Fontaines D.C. self-release their first single, "Liberty Belle".
 June – Sculpture Kindred Spirits in Midleton unveiled.
 8 September – Gothic horror film The Lodgers is premiered (at Toronto International Film Festival).
 2017 – Cairde, an Irish dance group, begins at the 2017 Fleadh Cheoil in Ennis, County Clare.

Sports

Association football

Group D
 2018 FIFA World Cup qualification – UEFA Group D

Denmark won 5–1 on aggregate and qualified for the 2018 FIFA World Cup.

Gaelic games
2017 All-Ireland Senior Hurling Championship Final
 3 September – Galway 0-26 – 2-17 Waterford

2017 All-Ireland Senior Football Championship Final
 17 September – Dublin 1-17 – 1-16 Mayo

Rugby Union
Ireland finished second to England in the 2017 Six Nations Championship.

Deaths

January

 1 January – Therese McGowan, 87, mother of The Pogues lead singer Shane MacGowan, car crash.
 3 January – Kevin Casey, 40, sports broadcaster, cancer.
 4 January – Veronica Steele, 69, cheesemaker.
 5 January – Frank Murphy, 69, middle-distance runner, Parkinson's disease.
 9 January – T. K. Whitaker, 100, economist and public servant.
 10 January – Mick Gribbin, 85, Gaelic footballer and coach (Derry).
 11 January – Victor Griffin, 92, clergyman, theologian and author.
 14 January
Barry Cassin, 92, stage actor and director.
Des Cullen, 86, motor sport enthusiast.
 15 January – Dermot Gallagher, 72, secretary-general at the Department of Foreign Affairs.
 18 January – Ronan Fanning, 75, historian.
 19 January – Eddie Filgate, 101, politician, TD (1977-1982).
 21 January – Eddie Barrett, 68, journalist and NUJ activist.
 23 January – Owen O'Callaghan, 76, property developer, illness.
 24 January – Peter Woodman, 73, archaeologist and academic, stroke.
 28 January – Many Clouds, 9, racehorse and winner of the 2015 Grand National, pulmonary haemorrhage.

February

 1 February – Pat O'Malley, 76, wife of Progressive Democrats founder Des O'Malley, cancer.
 8 February – Brendan McGahon, 80, politician, TD (1982-2002), short illness.
 13 February
Donal Devine, 40, former hurler (Westmeath)
Fame and Glory, 10, racehorse, heart attack.
 18 February
Samuel Poyntz, 90, former Bishop of Cork, Cloyne and Ross and Connor.
Sulamani, 17, racehorse, short illness.
 20 February – Leo Murphy, 78, former Gaelic footballer (Down).
 21 February
Desmond Connell, 90, cardinal and former Archbishop of Dublin, long illness.
Cosmo Haskard, 100, former Governor of the Falkland Islands and retired British Army officer.
Paul McCarthy, 45, former footballer (Brighton & Hove Albion and Wycombe Wanderers).
James O'Sullivan, 58, businessman and charity campaigner, cancer.
 22 February
Frank Delaney, 74, novelist, journalist and broadcaster.
Stephen Rhodes, 66, broadcaster, motor neurone disease.
 27 February – Peter Mathews, 65, economist and politician, TD (2011-2016), oesophageal cancer.

March

 8 March – Michael Maher, 87, hurler (Tipperary), long illness.
 11 March – Danehill Dancer, 24, Irish-bred, British-trained thoroughbred racehorse, old age.
 13 March – Eamon Casey, 89, Bishop emeritus of Galway and Kilmacduagh.
 14 March
Dara Fitzpatrick, 45, Irish coast guard helicopter pilot, helicopter crash.
Mark Duffy, 51, Irish coast guard helicopter pilot, helicopter crash.
Paul Ormsby, 50, Irish coast guard helicopter winchman, helicopter crash.
Ciarán Smith, 38, Irish coast guard helicopter winchman, helicopter crash.
 16 March – Roddy Gribbin, 92, Gaelic footballer and manager (Derry).
 17 March – Maureen Haughey, 91, wife of former Taoiseach Charles Haughey, short illness.
 19 March – John Rogan, 78, actor.
 21 March
Martin McGuinness, 66, politician, MP (1997-2013), MLA (1998-2017), Deputy First Minister of Northern Ireland (2007-2017), amyloidosis.
Mick Butler, 80, hurler (London).
 28 March – Anthony O'Hara, 61, hurler (Derry), illness.
 30 March – Tom Savage, 76, communications consultant, short illness.

April

 1 April – Des Kelly, 80, showband singer, long illness.
 3 April – Denis Mahony, 88, Gaelic footballer (Dublin).
 6 April – Imperial Commander, 16, racehorse and Cheltenham Gold Cup winner, heart attack.
 11 April – Micheál Moran, 42, Gaelic footballer (Cork).
 13 April – Dan Rooney, 84, United States Ambassador to Ireland.
 15 April – Michael Hayes, 59, President of Mary Immaculate College, short illness.
 18 April – Patrick Foley, 84, president of the European Golf Association, short illness.
 19 April – Pat Fitzpatrick, 60, keyboard player, liver cancer.
 21 April
Seán McEniff, 81, businessman and politician, Councillor (1967-2017), long illness following an accident.
Cape Cross, 23, racehorse, euthanized.
 23 April
Donnchadh Ó Buachalla, 72, judge.
Johnny Roe, 79, Irish champion jockey, short illness.
 24 April – Donal Toolan, 50, disability rights activist, short illness.
 27 April – Amberleigh House, 25, racehorse and 2004 Grand National winner, short illness.
 28 April – Donie Shine, 65, Gaelic football manager (Roscommon).

May

 3 May
Dick Strang, 77 Gaelic footballer (Tipperary), short illness.
Papillon, 26, racehorse and winner of the 2000 Grand National.
 4 May – Joseph Barnes, 102, physician and tropical medicine lecturer.
 7 May – Thomas A. White, 85, archbishop.
 10 May – Eunan Blake, footballer (Finn Harps, Sligo Rovers and Derry City F. C.), short illness.
 11 May – Kevin Linehan, television producer and RTÉ executive, Alzheimer's disease.
 12 May
Brendan Duddy, 80, businessman and Northern Ireland peace worker.
Felicity Fox, 49, businesswoman and estate agent, cancer.
 14 May – John Devane, 54, prominent Limerick solicitor, long illness.
 23 May
Aidan Gillic, 77, Gaelic football referee (Meath), short illness.
Paul O'Byrne, incoming president of Garryowen F.C. and surgeon, short illness.
 28 May – Hugh McCabe, 62, Gaelic football manager and player, (Fermanagh), cancer.

June

 2 June – Dominic Earley, 26, Gaelic football coach (Cavan), road traffic accident.
 4 June – Patrick Johnston, 58, academic and President of Queen's University, Belfast, suddenly.
 6 June – Georgie Leahy, 78, hurling coach, long illness.
 7 June
Alan Bonner, 33, motorcycle racer, accident.
Jack Finucane, 80, humanitarian and co-founder of Concern Worldwide, short illness.
 10 June
Austin Deasy, 80, politician, Senator (1973-1977), TD 1977–2002) and Minister for Agriculture (1982-1987), short illness.
Danny Sheehy, 61, poet, boating accident.
 11 June – Paul Giblin, 34, rower, cancer.
 12 June – Paul Muldowney, 78, journalist and news editor.
 14 June – Fred Cogley, 82, sports broadcaster.
 15 June – Ann Louise Gilligan, 71, university lecturer and theologian, short illness.
 16 June – Dick Warner, 70, broadcaster and environmentalist.
 22 June – Des Hanafin, 86, politician, Senator (1969-1993 and 1997–2002).

July

 1 July – Dave Roche, 50s, gay rights campaigner, heart attack.
 6 July – Gerry Sullivan, 92, actor (The Riordans and Glenroe).
 9 July – John McKnight, 86, Gaelic footballer (Armagh).
 10 July
Martin Molony, 91, jockey and horse trainer.
Fintan Morris, 51, author and historian.
 12 July – Tommy Carberry, 75, jockey and horse trainer.
15 July – Anne Buttimer, 78, Irish geographer, president of International Geographical Union (2000–2004).
19 July – Mary Turner, 79, Irish-born British trade union leader, long illness.
27 July – Robert Harris, 75, businessman, short illness.

August

 10 August – Tony Keady, 53, hurler (Galway), heart attack.
 15 August – Liam Devaney, 82, hurler (Tipperary), short illness.
 16 August – Michael Twomey, 84, actor, best known as one half of the comedy duo Cha and Miah, short illness.
 17 August – James Osborne, 68, businessman.
 22 August – Sean O'Callaghan, 62, IRA informer and author, drowning.
 28 August – Willie Duggan, 67, rugby union player, heart attack.

September

 1 September – Peadar Lamb, 87, actor, natural causes.
 4 September – Don Cockburn, 87, newscaster and broadcaster, short illness.
 11 September – J. P. Donleavy, 87, novelist and playwright, stroke.
 16 September – Brendan Reilly, 38, Gaelic footballer (Louth).
 20 September – Jimmy Magee, 82, sports broadcaster, short illness.
 26 September – Neville Furlong, 49, rugby player.
 29 September – Jimmy Walsh, Gaelic footballer (Meath).
30 September – Jimmy McDonnell, 90, Gaelic footballer (Louth).

October

 4 October – Liam Cosgrave, 97, politician, TD (1943–1981), Leader of Fine Gael (1965–1977), Taoiseach (1973–77).
 7 October – Martin Crotty, 71, barrister, sailor and designer, short illness.
 10 October
 Jackie O'Hara, Gaelic footballer (Sligo).
 Neill O'Neill, 36, managing editor (The Mayo News).
 15 October – Sean Hughes, 51, comedian, writer and actor, cirrhosis of the liver.
 18 October – Eamonn Campbell, 70, musician (The Dubliners).
 21 October – Pat Shovelin, 41, Gaelic football coach, cancer.
 23 October – Joe Corcoran, 77, Gaelic footballer (Mayo).
 25 October – Fayonagh, 6, racehorse, euthanised following a leg break.
 26 October – Simon Fitzmaurice, 43, filmmaker, motor neuron disease.
 29 October – Paddy Devlin, Gaelic football referee.

November
 6 November – Scott Fredericks, 74, actor (Doctor Who).
 9 November – Kevin Dawson, 57, TV producer and journalist, cancer.
 16 November
Ronan Drury, 93, Roman Catholic priest and journalist, illness.
Maxie McCann, 83, football player (Shamrock Rovers), illness.
 21 November – Liam Stirrat, 68, Gaelic footballer, manager and GAA administrator (Monaghan).
 23 November
 Frankie Kearney, 77, Gaelic football manager (Derry).
 Donal Creed, 93, politician, TD (1965-1981), MEP (1973-1977), Minister of State (1981-1986), Alzheimer's disease.
 25 November – Biddy White Lennon, 71, actress and food writer, short illness.
 29 November – Willie John Daly, 92, hurler (Cork).

December

 3 December – Thomas Finlay, 95, judge and politician, TD (1954–1957), Chief Justice (1985–1994).
 8 December
Robin Waters, 80, professional cricketer and cricket coach
Paddy O'Looney, 71, golf tourism chief.
 10 December – Leo McGinley, 100, Gaelic footballer (Donegal).
 12 December
 Izzy Dezu, 16, footballer (Shelbourne F.C.).
 Pat O'Rawe, politician, MLA for Newry Armagh (20032007).
 13 December – Kathleen O'Connor, 83, Clann na Poblachta TD for Kerry North and the youngest ever woman elected to Dáil Éireann (at a by-election in 1956).
 19 December – Noel O'Brien, 57, senior National Hunt handicapper, cancer
 23 December – Maurice Hayes, 90, politician, Senator (1996–2006).
 28 December – Nichols Canyon, 7, racehorse, euthanized after race fall.
 29 December – Peggy Cummins, 92, actress (Gun Crazy).
 30 December
Sean McCaffrey, 58, football manager (national team U-17 and U-19), diabetes and kidney disease.
Jackie Mooney, 79, footballer (Shamrock Rovers, Athlone Town and Bohemians).
 31 December – Doreen Keogh, 91, actress (Coronation Street, Father Ted and The Royle Family).

See also
2017 in Irish television

References

 
2010s in Ireland
Years of the 21st century in Ireland